The women's 57 kg (also known as lightweight) tournament in the judo at the 2008 Summer Olympics was held on August 11 at the Beijing Science and Technology University Gymnasium. A total of 22 women competed in this event, limited to jūdōka with a body weight of less than 57 kilograms. Preliminary rounds started at 12:00 Noon CST. Repechage finals, semifinals, bouts for bronze medals and the final were held at 18:00pm CST.

This event was the third-lightest of the women's judo weight classes, limiting competitors to a maximum of 57 kilograms of body mass. Like all other judo events, bouts lasted five minutes. If the bout was still tied at the end, it was extended for another five-minute, sudden-death period; if neither judoka scored during that period, the match is decided by the judges. The tournament bracket consisted of a single-elimination contest culminating in a gold medal match. There was also a repechage to determine the winners of the two bronze medals. Each judoka who had lost to a semifinalist competed in the repechage. The two judokas who lost in the semifinals faced the winner of the opposite half of the bracket's repechage in bronze medal bouts.

Qualifying athletes

Tournament results

Final

Mat 1
The gold and silver medalists were determined by the final match of the main single-elimination bracket.

Mat 2
The gold and silver medalists were determined by the final match of the main single-elimination bracket.

Repechage
Those judoka eliminated in earlier rounds by the four semifinalists of the main bracket advanced to the repechage. These matches determined the two bronze medalists for the event.

References

 Competition format

External links
 

W57
Judo at the Summer Olympics Women's Lightweight
Olympics W57
Women's events at the 2008 Summer Olympics